Rosettenville is a suburb of Johannesburg, South Africa. It lies to the south of the city centre.

History

Rosettenville is named after Leo (or Levin) Rosettenstein, who surveyed the land and sold stands after gold was discovered on the Witwatersrand.  Some roads are named after his family members.

Between 1924 and 1972, over 50 000 white Portuguese-speaking immigrants moved to the area, mostly from Portugal, but also from Madeira and Mozambique, which was then a Portuguese colony. After Mozambique gained independence from Portugal in 1976, many more white Mozambicans moved to South Africa, and many of them settled in Rosettenville.

The first ever Nando's restaurant was opened in Rosettenville in 1987.

Rosettenville is famously known as a place where the celebrated Anglican school, St Peter's College, where the likes of ANC President Oliver Tambo, Archbishop Desmond Tutu, Jonas Gwangwa, Hugh Masekela, Henry Makgothi and others did part of their high school education. St Peter's College later became St. Martin's School (Rosettenville)

Rosettenville is also known as the place where reggae musician Lucky Dube was shot dead in front of his children in October 2007.

Features
The vision of the suburb or the new JHB, is to clean up the area and influx potential investors. The area is close to glorious City of Johannesburg. Like most suburbs including Brixton, there is great potential for investors to uplift the area and gain a considerable profit. The area is not far from esteemed suburbs in the South, including Bassonia, Oakdene and Lin Meyer.

The suburb includes St. Mary's Anglican Church, Rosettenville and the landmark Wemmer Pan recreational area.

See also
Portuguese South Africans
Nandos

References 

Johannesburg Region F